Mötz is a municipality and a village in the Imst district, located 16.30 km east of Imst and 9 km west of Telfs. The first mention of the village dates back to the 12th century. Once connected with Mieming, Mötz became an own municipality after World War II. Main sources of income are agriculture, summer tourism but Mötz is also a typical residential area.

Population

References

External links

Mieming Range
Cities and towns in Imst District